Perarolo di Cadore is a comune (municipality) in the Province of Belluno in the Italian region of Veneto, located about  north of Venice and about  northeast of Belluno.

The Cadore Viaduct is nearby on the Strada statale 51 di Alemagna (SS51).

References

Cities and towns in Veneto